Rev. Fr. Ferdinand Bonnel, S.J., born on 31 August 1865 in Roubaix, France, and died on 7 May 1945 in Batticaloa, Sri Lanka, was a French Jesuit priest.

Biography
Bonnel was trained as novitiate of the Society of Jesus in Gemert, Netherlands, commencing 7 September 1888. His training continued with the study of philosophy (1891–1893) and theology (1897–1900) at the seminary of the Jesuits in Enghien, Belgium, with a break for a few years of apostolic experience in Reims between 1893 and 1897. He was ordained priest in Enghien in August 1899.

In 1902 he joined his brother Fr Charles Bonnel (also a Jesuit priest) as a missionary in Ceylon (now known as Sri Lanka). Bonnel spent a year studying the Tamil language (1902–1903) before he was appointed director of St. Michael's College National School. A position in which he remained for over forty years. He is one of the architects of St. Michael's College and founder of the school.

Twice he combined his duties as director with the Regional Superior of the Jesuits in the region of Trincomalee (from 1917 to 1930 and again from 1932 to 1944), after the unexpected death of his successor, Maurice Boutry. Bonnel was also for a time the vicar general of the diocese of Trincomalee.

Bonnel died in Batticaloa on 7 May 1945. Bonnel is considered as a renowned educator, who has been honored by issuing a Sri Lankan postage stamp with his image in 1988.

References 

1865 births
1945 deaths
Sri Lankan Jesuits
Sri Lankan people of French descent
Sri Lankan educational theorists
Heads of schools in Sri Lanka
St. Michael's College National School